St. Mary's Catholic Church is a Roman Catholic church at 306 W. San Antonio in Fredericksburg, Texas.

History

Old St. Mary's
The first Catholic church in Fredericksburg was a log house built in 1848. In 1861 it was replaced by a stone building, completed in 1863. Now called Old St. Mary's, since 1906 this building has served several purposes, including as a schoolhouse. Its place in the history of German immigration to Texas lead it to be listed as a Recorded Texas Historic Landmark in 1994.

St. Mary's today
By 1901 the church building was too small for the congregation. A new church was designed by San Antonio architect Leo M.J. Dielmann and built by contractor Jacob Wagner in 1906. The current St. Mary's contains many Gothic features such as buttresses, trefoil motifs, and a corner tower rising high above the roofline. The interior contains extensive painting and murals, including on the organ pipes and ceiling vaults, leading to its inclusion in the National Register of Historic Places as a painted church. It is also part of the National Register's Fredericksburg Historic District, and a Recorded Texas Historic Landmark.

The current campus also includes Our Lady of Guadalupe Catholic Church at 302 East College Street. Originally opened in 1919, it was closed in the 1940s, then reopened as a mission of St. Mary's for Spanish speakers in 1983.

See also

National Register of Historic Places listings in Gillespie County, Texas
Recorded Texas Historic Landmarks in Gillespie County

References

External links

Official site

20th-century Roman Catholic church buildings in the United States
Churches in Gillespie County, Texas
German-American culture in Texas
Gothic Revival church buildings in Texas
National Register of Historic Places in Gillespie County, Texas
Churches on the National Register of Historic Places in Texas
Roman Catholic churches completed in 1906
Roman Catholic churches in Texas
Buildings and structures in Fredericksburg, Texas
Historic district contributing properties in Texas
1848 establishments in Texas